Divine is a 2020 German-Italian romantic comedy film directed by Jan Schomburg.

Cast
Callum Turner as Gregory
Matilda De Angelis as Maria
Anna Bonaiuto as Teodora
Mark Davison as Robert
Gianni Meurer as the chief physician
Barbara Ricci as the nurse
Juliane Elting as Grazie Oscura
Eddie Osei as the Pope
Lewis Hart as Ian
Serra Yilmaz as the taxi driver
Pino Ammendola

References

External links

2020 films
2020s German-language films
German multilingual films
Italian multilingual films
2020s Italian-language films
2020 romantic comedy films
German romantic comedy films
Italian romantic comedy films
2020 multilingual films
2020s German films